The 1984 All-Pacific-10 Conference football team consists of American football players chosen by various organizations for All-Pacific-10 Conference teams for the 1984 college football season.

Offensive selections

Quarterbacks
Mark Rypien, Washington St.

Running backs
Rueben Mayes, Washington St.
Darryl Clack, Arizona St.
Fred Crutcher, USC

Wide receivers
 Lew Barnes, Oregon
 Reggie Bynum, Oregon St.

Tight ends
 Doug Herman, Oregon

Tackles
Mark Shupe, Arizona St.
Brent Martin, Stanford

Guards
Duval Love, UCLA
Ken Ruettgers, USC

Centers
Dan Lynch, Washington St.

Defensive selections

Linemen
Ron Holmes, Washington
Garin Veris, Stanford
David Wood, Arizona
Tony Colorito, USC

Linebackers
 Duane Bickett, USC
 Tim Meamber, Washington
 Lamonte Hunley, Arizona
 Fred Small, Washington
 Tommy Taylor, UCLA

Defensive backs
 David Fulcher, Arizona St.
Allan Durden, Arizona
Tommy Haynes, USC
Doug Judge, Oregon

Special teams

Placekickers
John Lee, UCLA

Punters
 Kevin Buenafe, UCLA

Return specialists 
Tony Cherry, Oregon

Key

See also
1984 College Football All-America Team

References

All-Pacific-10 Conference Football Team
All-Pac-12 Conference football teams